'Be Careful' is the debut street album by Baltimore rapper DeStorm Power. The album was released on May 1 and includes 15 songs, 14 on the standard edition. The mixtape's first single was "Finally Free" with Talib Kweli, but the first radio single was "Baddest Mutha" when the mixtape's host: DJ Whoo Kid premiered the song on Shade 45 on April 12, 2012.

Track listing

References

2012 debut albums
2012 mixtape albums